.do is the country code top-level domain (ccTLD) for the Dominican Republic. The Network Information Center .do has administered the domain since 1991.

Domains available 
Source:

 .do:  General use

Second-level
 art.do:  Arts institutions
 com.do:  Commercial organizations
 edu.do:  Academic institutions
 gob.do/gov.do:  Governmental institutions
 mil.do:  Military institutions
 net.do:  Internet service providers
 org.do:  Nongovernmental institutions
 sld.do:  Institutions of health

See also
 Internet in the Dominican Republic

References

External links
 IANA .do whois information
 NIC - Network Information Center

Communications in the Dominican Republic
Computer-related introductions in 1991
Country code top-level domains
Internet in the Dominican Republic

sv:Toppdomän#D